Ali-Mohammad Arab is an Iranian worker elected to the 73-seats Assembly of Experts for Constitution in 1979.

References

 Biography

1935 births
living people
Islamic Republican Party politicians
Laborers
Worker House members
Members of the Assembly of Experts for Constitution
People from Varamin